Debra Zane is a casting director, based in Los Angeles, California, known for her work in film and television. Zane has worked with some of the most successful directors in the world such as Steven Spielberg, Ridley Scott, and Steven Soderbergh.

She has been nominated for fourteen Artios Awards, and has won three  In 2004, she won the Hollywood Film Festival award for "Best Casting Director of the Year."

Credits

Film casting director
The Hunger Games (2012)
The Twilight Saga: Breaking Dawn – Part 1 (2011)
Rise of the Planet of the Apes (2011)
Battle: Los Angeles (2011)
Devil (2010)
X-Men Origins: Wolverine (2009)
Revolutionary Road (2008)
Indiana Jones and the Kingdom of the Crystal Skull (2008)
Ocean's Thirteen (2007)
Dreamgirls (2006)
The Good German (2006)
War of the Worlds (2005)
Kingdom of Heaven (2005)
Jarhead (2005)
Fun with Dick and Jane (2005)
Ocean's Twelve (2004)
Jarhead (2004)
Matchstick Men (2003)
Catch Me If You Can (2002)
Solaris (2002)
Ocean's Eleven (2011)
Traffic (2000)
American Beauty (1999)
Fear (1996)

TV casting director
Tracey Takes On... (1996-1997)
Bloodline (2015–present)
Good Behavior (2016–present)

Awards and nominations
Artios awards:

Nominated, 2009, Outstanding Achievement in Casting - Feature - Studio or Independent Drama/Comedy for: Revolutionary Road (shared with Ellen Lewis)
Nominated, 2009, Outstanding Achievement in Casting - Animation Feature for: The Tale of Despereaux
Won, 2007, Best Feature Film Casting - Drama for: Dreamgirls (shared with Jay Binder)
Nominated, 2004, Best Casting for Feature Film, Drama for: Seabiscuit
Nominated, 2002, Best Casting for Feature Film, Drama for: Road to Perdition
Won, 2001, Best Casting for Feature Film, Drama for: Traffic
Won, 2000, Best Casting for Feature Film, Drama for: American Beauty
Nominated, 2000, Best Casting for Feature Film, Drama for: Galaxy Quest
Nominated, 1999, Best Casting for TV, Comedy Episodic: Maximum Bob (shared with David Rubin)
Nominated, 1999, Best Casting for TV, Comedy Pilot for: Maximum Bob (shared with David Rubin)
Nominated, 1998, Best Casting for Feature Film, Comedy for: Wag the Dog (shared with Ellen Chenoweth)
Nominated, 1996, Best Casting for Feature Film, Comedy for: Get Shorty (shared with David Rubin)

References

External links 
 

American casting directors
Women casting directors
Living people
People from Los Angeles
Place of birth missing (living people)
Year of birth missing (living people)